The Austral plan was an Argentine economic plan devised by minister Juan Vital Sourrouille during the presidency of Raúl Alfonsín.

Previous context
Raúl Alfonsín became president of Argentina in 1983 through democratic elections, receiving high inflation rates and a significant external debt taken on by the outgoing Military government. His first minister of economy, Bernardo Grinspun, attempted to negotiate regular increases in wages to keep up with inflation, which did not work. The country was close to a sovereign default in late 1984, and prevented it with foreign funding. Grinspun resigned the following year, as the debt was even higher and the IMF would block further credits. Alfonsín said that democracy had little to offer "unless the economic question is definitely resolved".

Characteristics
The Austral plan was designed by the new minister, Juan Vital Sourrouille. It froze prices and wages, stopped the printing of money to mitigate inflation and enacted spending cuts, even higher than those required by the IMF to enable its funding. This plan was similar to the 1975's Rodrigazo. The Peso argentino currency was replaced by the Austral, according to a rate of 1000 pesos to 1 austral. The plan was an instant success, as inflation dropped immediately. This caused a boost in Alfonsín's public image, leading to a victory of the Radical Civic Union in the 1985 midterm elections.

The economy, however, took a turn for the worse. Export prices dropped, international debt increased, and the government was consistently opposed by both Peronism and the labor unions. The unions rejected the wage freeze, and asked for increases. The government soon started to print money again to deal with the increasing debts. As a result, inflation became a problem again in 1986. The government was defeated in the 1987 midterm elections, and inflation eventually became hyperinflation in 1989. Alfonsín resigned that year, amid riots, and was succeeded by elected president Carlos Menem six months before his due date. The Convertibility plan replaced the Austral with the Peso convertible, thus ending the Austral plan.

References

Bibliography

Further reading

 
 
 
 

Presidency of Raúl Alfonsín
Economic history of Argentina
Inflation in Argentina
1985 establishments in Argentina
1992 disestablishments in Argentina